Victor Guillen (1892 – 23 July 1968) was a West Indian cricket umpire. He stood in two Test matches between 1935 and 1948. He also played in one first-class match for Trinidad and Tobago in 1921/22.

See also
 List of Test cricket umpires

References

1892 births
1968 deaths
Trinidad and Tobago cricketers
Trinidad and Tobago cricket umpires
West Indian Test cricket umpires